The Wyoming State Penitentiary is a historic and current prison in Rawlins, Carbon County, Wyoming, which has operated from 1901.  It moved within Rawlins to a new location in 1981.  In 2018, it is a Wyoming Department of Corrections state maximum-security prison for men.

Wyoming State Penitentiary is also the location of Wyoming's death row for men and execution chamber, which is located in the prison's parole board meeting room. No death sentences have been carried out in Wyoming since the 1992 execution of convicted murderer Mark Hopkinson, and, in 2018, there were no inmates on death row.

History
The penitentiary opened in Rawlins in 1901.

Wyoming State Penitentiary District, at 6th and Walnut Streets in Rawlins, Wyoming, is a historic district that was listed on the National Register of Historic Places in 1983.  The listing included 14 contributing buildings.

The listing included the original Administration Building, which is a large stone structure designed by Salt Lake City architect Walter E. Ware and built in stages during the 1890s.  The design is generally Romanesque in style, including in its type of stonework and features such as a semicircular arch, vermiculated stone sills, short columns with foliated capitals, and cone-shaped roofs on its tower.

It was completed in 1901.  The 1901 building is now a museum called the Wyoming Frontier Prison. Visitors can go on guided tours through the old prison.  There are exhibits about the old and current prisons and the Wyoming Peace Officers' Museum.

The Ware-designed prison operated for 80 years.  Convict Henry Ruhl was executed there in 1945, the only person executed by the U.S. Federal Government in Wyoming. This facility closed as a prison in 1981 when replaced by the current location.

Modern
Its current complex which opened in 1980 at first housed about 500 medium-security prisoners.  The original portion of the complex, now called the North Facility, closed in 2001 as the newer South Facility opened. The South Facility boasts the third generation prison layout of 'pods.' A driving factor behind this was the faults with the star, or block, layout of the North Facility. Narrow halls and blind, sharp corners caused dangers to staff. Security issues of the old North Facility came to light when Corporal Wayne Martinez was killed by three inmates. The three inmates gained access to the control center Corporal Martinez was in, beating him with a fire extinguisher and stabbing him over thirty times. Two inmates involved in the attack were given life without the possibility of parole, while the third was sentenced to death. In memory of Corporal Martinez, the Wayne Martinez Training Center was given his name. The North Facility remains standing, but abandoned.

Prior to 1991 the Wyoming Board of Charities and Reform operated the prison. After, the Wyoming Department of Corrections operated it.

Notable inmates
 Russell Henderson (later transferred to Wyoming Medium Correctional Institution) - murderer of Matthew Shepard
 Aaron McKinney - murderer of Matthew Shepard
 Diazem Hossencofft - confessed murderer of Girly Chew Hossencofft
 James Wiley - murdered his step-mother, along with his three step-brothers.

Previous Wyoming territorial and state prison
Wyoming's first state prison, built in 1872 near Laramie, Wyoming and decommissioned in 1901, is now the Wyoming Territorial Prison State Historic Site.   It operated as a federal penitentiary from 1872 to 1890, and as a state prison from 1890 to 1901.

References

External links
 Wyoming State Penitentiary
 Wyoming Frontier Prison
 Wyoming Peace Officer's Museum
 Wyoming state Penitentiary at the Wyoming State Historic Preservation Office

Prisons in Wyoming
Buildings and structures in Carbon County, Wyoming
Capital punishment in Wyoming
Execution sites in the United States
Rawlins, Wyoming
1901 establishments in Wyoming
National Register of Historic Places in Carbon County, Wyoming
Romanesque Revival architecture in Wyoming
Mission Revival architecture in Wyoming
Buildings and structures completed in 1894